Sirgapoor Niranjan Reddy (born 22 July 1970) is an Indian lawyer, film producer and politician who is currently serving as the Member of Parliament in Rajya Sabha from Andhra Pradesh since 2022. Reddy is known for producing Telugu films like Wild Dog (2021), and Arjuna Phalguna (2021), and Acharya (2022).

In June 2022, Reddy was elected as an MP in the 2022 Rajya Sabha elections, contesting on behalf of YSR Congress Party.

Early life
Niranjan Reddy was born on 22 July 1970, he hails from an agricultural family from Nirmal town in Adilabad district.

Career

Legal career
After completing law from the Symbiosis Law College in Pune in 1992 he joined the legal practice at the erstwhile AP High Court under senior advocates O Manohar Reddy and K Pratap Reddy. He also worked under Justice Muralidhar for a brief stint in Supreme Court in 1994-95 and was designated as a Senior Counsel in 2016. 

Reddy represented several cases and clients and was also the standing counsel for the Election Commission of India and Medical Council of India. He has appeared as special senior counsel for the state of Telangana and Andhra Pradesh in various matters. He worked as the lawyer in Y. S. Jagan Mohan Reddy‘s disproportionate assets cases.

He is currently practising in Supreme Court, New Delhi

Film career
Reddy produced several films including Acharya (2022), Ghazi, Wild Dog (2021), and Arjuna Phalguna (2021). Reddy served as an additional director in PVP Ventures. In the beginning, he co-produced films with Dil Raju and PVP, later he become an independent producer.

Political career
Reddy's candidature was finalized by YSR Congress Party for Rajya Sabha elections held in June 2022. Reddy, along with three other candidates of YSRCP were elected unopposed.

Filmography

References

External links
 

Living people
YSR Congress Party politicians
Telugu politicians
1970 births
Rajya Sabha members from Andhra Pradesh